Hasan Abu Zaid, (born February 4, 1991) is an Israeli footballer who plays as a defensive midfielder for Palestinian Premier League club Shabab Al-Khalil.

Club career
Abu Zaid grew up in the Bnei Yehuda youth academy, where he played 3 seasons of senior club football. At the beginning of the 2012-2013 season Abu Zaid joined Maccabi Tel Aviv.

Honours
Maccabi Tel Aviv
Israeli Premier League (1): 2012–13

External links
 ABU ZAID JOINS MACCABI TEL AVIV – Maccabi Tel Aviv

1991 births
Living people
Israeli footballers
Bnei Yehuda Tel Aviv F.C. players
Maccabi Tel Aviv F.C. players
Hapoel Nir Ramat HaSharon F.C. players
AEK Larnaca FC players
Maccabi Petah Tikva F.C. players
Hapoel Petah Tikva F.C. players
FC Armavir players
Hapoel Tel Aviv F.C. players
Maccabi Ahi Nazareth F.C. players
Hapoel Iksal F.C. players
Hapoel Hadera F.C. players
Hapoel Bnei Lod F.C. players
Shabab Al-Khalil SC players
Israeli Premier League players
Cypriot First Division players
Liga Leumit players
West Bank Premier League players
Arab-Israeli footballers
Arab citizens of Israel
Israeli expatriate footballers
Expatriate footballers in Cyprus
Expatriate footballers in Russia
Israeli expatriate sportspeople in Cyprus
Israeli expatriate sportspeople in Russia
Footballers from Lod
Association football midfielders